The Women's mass start competition at the 2017 World Single Distances Speed Skating Championships was held on 12 February 2017.

Results
The race was started at 20:14.

References

Women's mass start
World